Kape at Balita is a Philippine television news broadcasting show broadcast by GMA Network and GMA News TV. Originally hosted by Jessica Soho and Bobby Guanzon, it premiered on February 11, 1991 and concluded on GMA Network in 1993. The show returned on October 22, 2012 on GMA News TV. The show concluded on August 16, 2013.

History
Kape at Balita premiered on February 11, 1991, anchored by Jessica Soho and Bobby Guanzon. The program shown simultaneously on GMA Network and DZBB 594 AM, it was one of the first TV-radio simulcast program, with Guanzon anchoring the show from the DZBB studio, and Soho hosting from the GMA News studio. It ended on December 3, 1993.

On October 22, 2012, Kape at Balita returned on air with new hosts and it was transferred to GMA News TV. Susan Enriquez serves as the main anchor of the program with DZBB anchor Joel Reyes Zobel, Michael Fajatin, Mariz Umali, and Valerie Tan as co-hosts. The program ended on August 16, 2013.

Hosts

Susan Enriquez
Joel Reyes Zobel
Michael Fajatin
Mariz Umali
Valerie Tan
Bobby Guanzon
Jessica Soho
Lito Villarosa (reliever of Bobby Guanzon)

References

1991 Philippine television series debuts
1993 Philippine television series endings
2012 Philippine television series debuts
2013 Philippine television series endings
GMA Network news shows
GMA News TV original programming
Breakfast television in the Philippines
Filipino-language television shows
Philippine television news shows
Television series revived after cancellation